LPO may refer to:
Lipid peroxidation
LPO-50, a flamethrower built by the Soviet Union
Law practice optimization
Landing Page Optimization
Leading Petty Officer
Legal Process Outsourcing
Lexicographic path ordering, a well-ordering in term rewriting (computer science)
Libertarian Party of Ohio
Libration point orbit
Licensed Post Office
Limited principle of omniscience
London Philharmonic Orchestra
Louisiana Philharmonic Orchestra
Lactoperoxidase, an antibacterial protein present in milk and saliva